General Díaz is a neighbourhood Asunción, Paraguay. General Diaz or Díaz may also refer to:

Club General Díaz, a Paraguayan football club
Armando Diaz (1861–1928), Royal Italian Army general
Antonio F. Díaz (1789-1869), Uruguayan Army general
Félix Díaz (politician) (1868–1945), Mexican Federal Army general
José E. Díaz (1833–1867), Paraguayan Army general
Porfirio Díaz (1830–1915), Mexican Army general

See also
Francis Dias (1934–2019), Indian Army lieutenant general
Jagath Dias (born 1960), Sri Lanka Army major general